Liang Jincai (17 December 1927 – 17 January 2023) was a Chinese aerospace engineer, and an academician of the Chinese Academy of Engineering.

Biography
Liang was born in Beijing, on 17 December 1927, while his ancestral home is in Nanhai District of Foshan, Guangdong. In 1946, he entered Peking University, where he majored in the Department of Electrical Engineering. After graduating in 1950, he taught at the Department of Telecommunications, Beijing Railway University, and moved to Harbin Railway University two years later. In November 1957, he was sent to study at Bauman Moscow State Technical University at the expense of the Communist government, earning a vice-doctorate degree in 1961. He returned to China in September 1961 and continued to teach at Beijing Railway University.

In June 1962, Liang was despatched to the 2nd Branch of the 5th Research Institute of the Ministry of Defense, and was transferred to the 22nd Design Institute of Shanghai Second Electromechanical Bureau (now Shanghai Academy of Spaceflight Technology) in September 1965.

Liang died on 17 January 2023, at the age of 95.

Honours and awards
 1990 State Science and Technology Progress Award (First Class) for developing a missile system
 1996 State Science and Technology Progress Award (Third Class) for developing a missile system
 November 1997 Member of the Chinese Academy of Engineering (CAE)

References

Bibliography
 

1927 births
2023 deaths
Engineers from Beijing
Peking University alumni
Bauman Moscow State Technical University alumni
Members of the Chinese Academy of Engineering
20th-century Chinese engineers
21st-century Chinese engineers